Hay House is a book publisher located in California.

It may also refer to:
Johnston-Felton-Hay House, Macon, Georgia, a U.S. National Historic Landmark often known as Hay House
Hay-Morrison House, Salem, Indiana, listed on the National Register of Historic Places
Dr. J.A. Hay House, La Grange, Missouri, listed on the NRHP in Lewis County, Missouri
Hay Estate (The Fells), Newbury, New Hampshire, NRHP-listed
Hay-McKinney and Bingham-Hanna House, Cleveland, Ohio, listed on the NRHP in Cleveland, Ohio
Hay house is a rare term for a hay barn

See also
Hays House (disambiguation)
Hayes House (disambiguation)